Licensed to Ill is the debut studio album by American rap rock group Beastie Boys. It was released on November 15, 1986, by Def Jam and Columbia Records, and became the first rap LP to top the Billboard album chart. It is one of Columbia Records' fastest-selling debut records to date and was certified Diamond by the Recording Industry Association of America in 2015 for shipping over ten million copies in the United States. The album  received critical acclaim for its unique musical style, chemistry between the group members, and their stylized rapping. Since its release, Licensed to Ill has been ranked by critics as one of the greatest hip hop and debut albums of all time.

Background
The group originally wanted to title the album Don't Be a Faggot, but Columbia Records refused to release the album under this title—arguing that it was homophobic—and pressured Russell Simmons, Beastie Boys' manager and head of Def Jam Recordings at the time, into forcing them to choose another name. Adam Horovitz has since apologized for the album's earlier title.

Kerry King of Slayer made an appearance on the album playing lead guitar on "No Sleep Till Brooklyn" and appeared in the music video which is a parody of glam metal. The name of the song itself is a spoof on Motörhead's No Sleep 'til Hammersmith album. King's appearance on the track came about because Rick Rubin was producing both bands simultaneously (Slayer's Reign in Blood was released one month prior on Def Jam).

CBS/Fox Video released a video album of the five Licensed to Ill videos, plus "She's on It" in 1987 to capitalize on the album's success. A laserdisc version was also released in Japan. All versions of the CBS/Fox release are currently out of print because the rights to the album passed from Columbia and Sony Music to Universal Music Group, and also because of the acrimonious nature of the band's departure from Def Jam Records. Until the 2005 release of the CD/DVD Solid Gold Hits, none of the Def Jam-era videos had been included on any subsequent Beastie Boys video compilations. The Solid Gold Hits DVD includes the videos for "Fight for Your Right" and "No Sleep Till Brooklyn", as well as a live version of "Brass Monkey" from a 2004 concert.

Beastie Boys recorded a loose rendition of the Beatles' "I'm Down" for the album, which included sampling of the original song, but the track was pulled at the last minute due to legal disputes with Michael Jackson who owned the publishing rights. Both "I'm Down," and another track, "Scenario," were cut at the last minute. Bootleg versions of the songs can be found on the internet.

Artwork
The full album cover, front to back, features an American Airlines Boeing 727 with a Beastie Boys logo on its tail, which has crashed head-on into the side of a mountain, appearing as an extinguished joint. The tail of the plane also features the Def Jam logo and the registration number '3MTA3' which spells 'EATME' when viewed in a mirror. The idea for the album's cover came from the album's producer, Rick Rubin, after reading the Led Zeppelin biography Hammer of the Gods. The artwork was created by Stephen Byram and World B. Omes. The album cover was featured in Storm Thorgerson's and Aubrey Powell's book, 100 Best Album Covers. The cover design has since been appropriated by fellow rapper, Eminem, for the cover of his 2018 album, Kamikaze.

Critical reception

In 1998, the album was selected as one of The Sources 100 Best Rap Albums. It is the only album by a Jewish hip-hop act to receive 5 mics from The Source. In 2003, the album was ranked number 217 on Rolling Stone magazine's list of the 500 greatest albums of all time 219 in a 2012 revised list, and 192 in a 2020 revised list. In 2013 the magazine named it the best debut album of all time. Vibe included it in Vibe'''s 100 Essential Albums of the 20th Century. Q gave the album four out of five stars, saying "Licensed to Ill remains the world's only punk rock rap album, arguably superior to Never Mind the Bollocks ... knowing that apathy and slovenliness were just around the corner." Melody Maker gave the album a positive review, saying "There's lots of self-reverential bragging, more tenuous rhymes than are usually permitted by law and, most importantly of all, an unshakably glorious celebration of being alive ... A surprisingly enduring classic." In 2002, Pitchfork ranked the album at number 41 on its list of the "Top 100 Albums of the 1980s", despite their prior unflattering review of the album. In the 2018 edition of the "Top 200 Albums of the 1980s", the album placed number 103.

In 2006, Q magazine placed the album at number 16 in its list of "40 Best Albums of the '80s". In 2012, Slant Magazine listed the album at number 12 on its list of "Best Albums of the 1980s" saying "Rife with layer upon layer of sampling, start-stop transitions, and aggressive beats, it helped transform the genre from a direct dialogue between MC and DJ into a piercing, multi-threaded narrative" and "helped set an exciting template for the future". Eminem said the album was one of his favorites of all time and said it changed hip hop. The album was also included in the book 1001 Albums You Must Hear Before You Die.Cash Box called "She's Crafty" a "slamming tongue-in-cheek rocker."

Commercial performance
The album was certified Platinum by the Recording Industry Association of America (RIAA) on February 2, 1987 and eventually was certified Diamond on March 4, 2015. The single "Brass Monkey" was certified Gold for shipment of 500,000+ sales. In 2012, in the week following Adam Yauch's death, which subsequently resulted in a surge in sales of Beastie Boys albums, Licensed to Ill reached number 1 on Billboards Catalog Albums chart. The album also re-entered the Billboard 200 chart at number 18.

Track listing

Personnel
 Beastie Boys – producers
 Joe Blaney – mixing
 Steven Ett – audio engineer
 Kerry King – lead guitar on "No Sleep till Brooklyn" 
 Rick Rubin – producer
 Steve Byram – art direction
 Sunny Bak – photography
 World B. Omes (David Gambale) – cover art
 Nelson Keene Carse – trombone
 Danny Lipman – trumpet
 Tony Orbach – tenor saxophone

Charts

Weekly charts

 Year-end charts 

Certifications

See also
 Album era
 Kamikaze'', a 2018 Eminem album with an inspired cover.

References

External links
 

1986 debut albums
Albums produced by Rick Rubin
Beastie Boys albums
Def Jam Recordings albums
Columbia Records albums
Rap rock albums by American artists
Hip hop albums by American artists